Cloniocerus ochripennis is a species of beetle in the family Cerambycidae. It was described by Breuning in 1940. It is known from Tanzania.

References

Endemic fauna of Tanzania
Lamiinae
Beetles described in 1940